Marcela Holguín or Marcela Priscila Holguín Naranjo (born November 23, 1973) is an Ecuadorian politician. In 2002 she became the first Vice President of the National Assembly of Ecuador.

Life 
Holguín was born in Manabí Province, Ecuador in 1973. Holguín graduated from the Central University of Ecuador, before she gained her master's degree in communication in 2007 at the Andean University "Simón Bolívar".

In 2006 she began a career in journalism working for Ecuavisa. She then became active in the Alianza País political party and she was their candidate to the National Assembly in Pichincha's North Central District.

In 2019 Holguin was one of three members of the National Assembly investigated by the Attorney General for allegedly inciting violence during the General Strike in October 2019. The other two were Marcela Aguiñaga and Daniel Romero.

On July 21, 2022 she was elected as the National Assembly's First Vice President.

References 

1973 births
Living people
Ecuadorian journalists
21st-century Ecuadorian women politicians
21st-century Ecuadorian politicians